The 1980 Gael Linn Cup, the most important representative competition for elite level participants in the women's team field sport of camogie, was won by Munster, who defeated Leinster in the final, played at St John's Park.
Munster defeated Ulster 4–8 to 0–2 at Roscrea while Orla Ni Siochain scored 4–1 as Leinster defeated Connacht 6–7 to 1–4 at Castlebar. Goals from Mary O'Leary and Pat Moloney ensured Munster then won the final against Leinster at St John's Park by 2–5 to 2–1 .
Agnes Hourigan wrote in the Irish Press: Although Leinster had a wealth of talent from Dublin, Kilkenny and Wexford, the Munster side, made up aomost completely of players from Cork, the All-Ireland champions, seemed to combine better as a team.

Gael Linn Trophy

In the trophy final Leinster defeated Connacht 10–7 to 0–1 at Castlebar while Munster defeateded Ulster 7–13 to 1–5 at Roscrea. Munster then won the final against Leinster at St John's Park by 1–9 to 3–2.

Final stages

|}

Junior Final

|}

References

External links
 Camogie Association

1980 in camogie
1980